Giada Wiltshire is an Italian beauty pageant contestant of partial English descent through her father, who won Miss World Italy 2007 and represented Italy in Miss World 2007 in China. She studied at the Art Institute of Faenza in Ravenna, Italy.

References

Miss World 2007 delegates
1990 births
Living people
Italian beauty pageant winners
Italian people of English descent